Fritz Schulz may refer to:

 Fritz Schulz (jurist) (1879–1957), German jurist and legal historian
 Fritz W. Schulz (1884–1962), German marine artist and illustrator
 Fritz Schulz (footballer) (1886–1918), German footballer
 Fritz Schulz (actor) (1896–1972), film actor